Lynda Ann Wiesmeier (pronounced WEES-myer, May 30, 1963 – December 16, 2012) was an American model and actress.  She made her film debut in American Pop. Wiesmeier was selected as both cover model and Playmate of the Month for the July 1982 issue of Playboy magazine, and her centerfold was photographed by Richard Fegley.  Wiesmeier also appeared in several Playboy newsstand special editions and videos, and worked steadily for Playboy for more than five years after she graced the magazine's fold-out page, first as a nude glamour and pin-up model, and then as a promotional model and a feature reporter for the Playboy Channel.

She died at age 49 in December 2012 due to a brain tumor.

Appearances in Playboy videos
Playboy: 50 Years of Playmates (2004) – archival footage
Playboy: Video Centerfold Tawnni Cable (1991)
Playboy: Playmates At Play (1990)
Playboy: Wet & Wild (1989)
Playboy: Playmate Playoffs (1986)
Playboy: Video Playmate Review (1983)

Filmography
Evil Town (1987)
Touch and Go (1986)
Teen Wolf (1985)
Real Genius (1985)
Wheels of Fire (1985)
Avenging Angel (1985)
Malibu Express (1985)
R.S.V.P. (1984)
Preppies (1984)
Private School (1983)
Joysticks (1983)
American Pop (1981)

See also
 List of people in Playboy 1980–1989
 List of Playboy Playmates of 1982#July

References

External links
 
 
 

1963 births
2012 deaths
Deaths from brain cancer in the United States
1980s Playboy Playmates
American film actresses
21st-century American women